U238 or U-238 may be:

 , a German World War II U-boat (submarine)
 Uranium-238 (U-238 or 238U), the most common isotope of uranium